The 1989–1990 Highland Football League was won by Elgin City. Clachnacuddin finished bottom.

Teams

Table

Highland Football League seasons
4